Alwayz Ready was a professional wrestling pay-per-view (PPV) event promoted by the National Wrestling Alliance. It took place on June 11, 2022 at the Knoxville Convention Center in Knoxville, Tennessee.

Thirteen matches were contested at the event, including two on the pre-show. In the main event, Trevor Murdoch defeated Nick Aldis, Thom Latimer and Sam Shaw in a fatal four-way match for the vacant NWA Worlds Heavyweight Championship. In other prominent matches, The Commonwealth Connection (Doug Williams and Harry Smith) defeated La Rebelión (Bestia 666 and Mecha Wolf 450) to win the NWA World Tag Team Championship and Pretty Empowered (Ella Envy and Kenzie Paige) defeated The Hex (Allysin Kay and Marti Belle) to win the NWA World Women's Tag Team Championship. Also on the show, Aron Stevens lost to Murdoch in his last match before retiring from wrestling.

Production

Background
On April 25, 2022, the National Wrestling Alliance announced that NWA Alwayz Ready would take place on June 11 in Knoxville, Tennessee.

After learning about the NWA's next pay-per-view event taking place in Knoxville, NWA Worlds Heavyweight Champion Matt Cardona, in storyline, demanded that the event be dedicated to him if he was going to wrestle in the city. This included his entrance music ("When The Lights Go Down" by Downstait) acting as the show's main theme song, promotional material to feature his brand and likeness, a modified NWA logo that reads "MCWA" (Matt Cardona Wrestling Alliance), and even the event's name being his catchphrase.

Storylines
The event features professional wrestling matches that involve different wrestlers from pre-existing scripted feuds and storylines. Wrestlers portray heroes, villains, or less distinguishable characters in scripted events that build tension and culminate in a wrestling match or series of matches. Storylines were produced during the eighth season and second season, respectively, of the NWA's weekly series; Powerrr and USA.

On the Powerrr after the Crockett Cup, NWA World Television Champion Tyrus and manager Austin Idol announced an open Bodyslam Challenge, where if anybody was able to bodyslam Tyrus in three attempts, they would earn a title match. On May 3, Matthew Mims answered the challenge, and despite foul play from Tyrus, Mims was able to slam the champion. On May 5, it was confirmed the Mims would have his television title match with Tyrus at Alwayz Ready.

On the May 10 episode of Powerrr, KiLynn King defeated Chelsea Green and Jennacide in a three-way match to become the number one contender to the NWA World Women's Championship, earning a title match against Kamille at Alwayz Ready.

On Night 2 of the Crockett Cup, Matt Cardona retained the NWA Worlds Heavyweight Championship against Nick Aldis via disqualification, after special guest referee Jeff Jarrett believed Aldis' wife Mickie James gave him a low blow when it was in fact Cardona's wife Chelsea Green. On May 11, the NWA announced a rematch between the two for Alwayz Ready, with both men having requested a special stipulation. Aldis asked for a steel cage match, while Cardona proposed a deathmatch. NWA president Billy Corgan would select the stipulation at a future date. At Game Changer Wrestling's Downward Spiral event, Cardona suffered a torn biceps and would require surgery. Cardona confirmed he would still appear at the event but would not be able to compete. 

After losing the NWA Worlds Heavyweight Championship to Matt Cardona at NWA PowerrrTrip, Trevor Murdoch began adopting a more aggressive side to his wrestling skills, being much more deliberate in defeating his opponents. Around this time, his friends Aron Stevens and The Pope would call out Murdoch, hoping to figure out what was going through his head and to try and knock some sense into him. Stevens would eventually confront Murdoch in a match on the April 26 episode of Powerrr, only to be defeated. The week after that, Stevens formally announced his retirement from professional wrestling. On May 23, the NWA announced that Stevens would have his last match, dubbed "Aron Stevens' Swan Song", against Murdoch at Alwayz Ready.

Results

See also
2022 in professional wrestling

Notes

References

External links

2022 in Tennessee
2022 in professional wrestling
National Wrestling Alliance pay-per-view events
March 2022 events in the United States
Events in Tennessee
Professional wrestling in Tennessee